Nights of Fire (French: Nuits de feu) is a 1937 French drama film directed by Marcel L'Herbier and starring Gaby Morlay, Victor Francen and Madeleine Robinson. The scenario is based on the 1901 work The Living Corpse by Leo Tolstoy. The film's sets were designed by the art directors Guy de Gastyne and Eugène Lourié while the costumes were by Georges Annenkov.

Cast 
 Gaby Morlay as Lisa Andreieva
 Victor Francen as Fedor Andreiev
 George Rigaud as Serge Rostoff
 Madeleine Robinson as Macha
 Sinoël as  the man at the jury court
 Mia Slavenska as  the ballerina
 Paule Andral as  Lisa's mother
 Gabriel Signoret as  the substitute Bobinine 
 Jeanne Lory as Misses Bobinine
 Odette Talazac as a gipsy
 André Nox as  the president
 René Bergeron as  an informer
 Jean Toulout as  Balichev
 René Génin as   Balichev's client
 Paulette Burguetas  the photographer
 Albert Malbert as	Le cocher
 Yvonne Yma as 	La femme du cocher
 Marguerite de Morlaye as 	Une spectatrice à l'opéra
 Luce Fabiole as Une invitée aux fiançailles
 Blanche Denège as 	Une invitée aux fiançailles
 Jeanne de Carol as 	Une invitée aux fiançailles 
 Ernest Ferny as 	L'officier
 Charles Dorat as 	Un prisonnier
 Roger Monteaux as 	Le commissaire
 Titys as 	Un magistrat
 Roger Legris as 	Le jeune soldat
 Sylvain as Un soldat
 Robert Ozanne as Un soldat
 Robert Ralphy as Le secrétaire du procureur
Jacques Beauvais as Le pêcheur
 Pierre Juvenet as 	Un invité

References

Bibliography
 Goble, Alan. The Complete Index to Literary Sources in Film. Walter de Gruyter, 1999.

External links 
 
 Nuits de feu (1937) at the Films de France
  Fiche sur Nuits de feu sur le site DvdToile
  Fiche sur Nuits de Feu sur le site ToutleCine

1937 films
French drama films
1930s French-language films
French black-and-white films
Films directed by Marcel L'Herbier
1937 drama films
Films based on works by Leo Tolstoy
1930s French films